Hamacanthidae is a family of sponges belonging to the order Merliida.

Genera:
 Hamacantha Gray, 1867
 Pozziella Topsent, 1896
 Zygherpe de Laubenfels, 1932

References

Sponge families